Esperance Stonehenge is a full-sized replica of Stonehenge, in Esperance, Western Australia.

The stone was originally quarried and shaped for a similar project in Margaret River in 2008, funded by a millionaire. That project fell through after 12 months, after the stone had already been cut. The Rotary Club of Esperance promoted the idea of building a Stonehenge replica locally, but the plan was controversial, received mixed reactions from the community, and there was no agreed-upon site.

Kim and Jillian Beale, who owned a hobby farm across from the quarry, decided to build the replica on their property with their own money in 2011, after receiving approval from the Shire of Esperance in 2010. It was designed by architect Michael Sorensen of Sorensen Architects, and used  of Desert Brown granite supplied and installed by AustralAsian Granite. It is operated as a tourist attraction, charging $10 per adult .

References

External links
Official site

Esperance, Western Australia
Stonehenge replicas and derivatives